Quadree Khalid Henderson (born September 12, 1996) is a former American football wide receiver and return specialist. He played college football at the University of Pittsburgh.

College career
A consensus All-American in 2016, Henderson lead the FBS with 1,166 total return yards.  His 15.8 yards per punt return and 30.5 yards per kick return were good for third and fifth in the country, respectively. On offense he had 26 receptions for 286 yards and a touchdown, and 60 rushes for 631 yards and 5 touchdowns.

In 2017, Henderson lead the Panthers with 1,204 all-purpose yards (100.3/game), and was named 2nd team All-ACC returner.

On December 4, 2017, Henderson declared his intentions to enter the 2018 NFL Draft.

Professional career
Henderson was among seven Pitt Panthers in the 2018 Draft class invited to the NFL Scouting Combine.

Pittsburgh Steelers 
Henderson signed with the Pittsburgh Steelers as an undrafted free agent on April 28, 2018. He was waived on September 1, 2018.

New York Giants 
On October 3, Henderson was signed to the New York Giants' practice squad. Following the concussion of teammate Jawill Davis, Henderson was promoted the Giants' active roster on October 22, 2018. He was waived on November 6, 2018 and re-signed to the practice squad. He was promoted to the active roster on November 10, 2018. He was placed on injured reserve on November 26, 2018 with a shoulder injury.

On April 3, 2019, Henderson was waived by the Giants.

New York Jets
On April 5, 2019, Henderson was claimed off waivers by the New York Jets. He was waived on August 5, 2019.

Jacksonville Jaguars
On August 9, 2019, Henderson was signed by the Jacksonville Jaguars. He was waived on August 31, 2019.

In October 2019, Henderson was drafted by the XFL to play for the New York Guardians.

Carolina Panthers
On October 28, 2019, Henderson was signed to the Carolina Panthers practice squad. He was released on November 13.

Pittsburgh Steelers (second stint)
On November 18, 2019, Henderson was signed to the Pittsburgh Steelers practice squad. On December 30, he was signed by the Steelers to a reserve/future contract. He was waived on August 2, 2020.

Winnipeg Blue Bombers
Henderson signed with the Winnipeg Blue Bombers of the CFL on February 17, 2021. He was released on July 21, 2021.

BC Lions
Henderson signed with the Lions at the end of the 2021 season.

He announced his retirement on April 7, 2022.

References

External links
 Pittsburgh Panthers bio

1996 births
Living people
All-American college football players
American football return specialists
American football wide receivers
American players of Canadian football
Carolina Panthers players
Jacksonville Jaguars players
New York Giants players
New York Guardians players
New York Jets players
Pittsburgh Panthers football players
Pittsburgh Steelers players
Players of American football from Wilmington, Delaware
Winnipeg Blue Bombers players